Èarlaid was the right sometimes sold by an outgoing to an incoming tenant to enter into possession of the arable land early in Spring - the incomer doing the ploughing, sowing and planting, and subsequently claiming the resulting crop. It is in vogue only in places where Whitsunday is the removal term for farmers.

References
  Èarlaid

Agriculture in Scotland
Scots law